Liebich is a surname. Notable people with the surname include:

 Beate Liebich (born 1958), German middle-distance runner
 Curt Liebich (1868–1937), German painter
 Stefan Liebich (born 1972), German politician

German-language surnames